Acytolepis is a genus of small butterflies that belongs to the lycaenids or blues (family Lycaenidae). The genus was first described by Lambertus Johannes Toxopeus in 1927. The species are found in the Indomalayan and the Australasian realms.

Taxonomy
The type specimen for the genus Acytolepis is Acytolepis puspa.

Species
Acytolepis puspa (Horsfield, 1828)
Acytolepis lilacea (Hampson, 1889)
Acytolepis najara (Fruhstorfer, 1910)
Acytolepis ripte (H. H. Druce, 1895)
Acytolepis samanga (Fruhstorfer, 1910)

See also
List of butterflies of India
List of butterflies of India (Lycaenidae)

References

External links

images representing Acytolepis at Consortium for the Barcode of Life

 
Lycaenidae genera
Taxa named by Lambertus Johannes Toxopeus